Gail C. Murphy  is a Canadian computer scientist who specializes in software engineering and knowledge worker productivity. Murphy is a full professor in the Department of Computer Science at the University of British Columbia, Vancouver. In 2016, she was named Associate Vice President Research pro tem and assumed the role of Vice-President, Research & Innovation on August 14, 2017. Murphy is co-founder and was Chief Scientist at Tasktop Technologies Incorporated.

Biography 
Murphy received her B.Sc. from the University of Alberta in 1987 and a M.S. and a Ph.D. in computer science at the University of Washington, in 1994 and 1996 respectively. Murphy has served on editorial boards for Communications of the ACM, and Institute of Electrical and Electronics Engineers Transactions on Software Engineering.

Awards 
2010: Named ACM Distinguished Member

2014: University of Washington Computer Science and Engineering Alumni Achievement Award

2015: Named Fellow of the Royal Society of Canada

2016: ICSE Most Influential Paper Award (10 years after publication) (co-authored with John Anvik and Lyndon Hiew)

2017: ACM Fellow

2023: ACM SIGSOFT Outstanding Research Award

References

Fellows of the Association for Computing Machinery
Fellows of the Royal Society of Canada
Academic staff of the University of British Columbia
University of Alberta alumni
University of Washington alumni
Year of birth missing (living people)
Living people
Canadian women scientists
Canadian computer scientists